Scholar Extraordinary is a biography of Max Müller published by Chatto & Windus in 1974. The book was written by Nirad C. Chaudhuri. In addition to detailing the life of Müller, Chaudhuri also places in context the social and psychological aspects of the era and handles Müller's actions with that backdrop.

The book won the Sahitya Akademi Award in 1975.

References

Bibliography

Indian biographies
1974 non-fiction books
20th-century Indian books
Sahitya Akademi Award-winning works